Bloodsuckers from Outer Space is a 1984 American comedy horror film written and directed by Glen Coburn.  It stars Thom Meyers, Dennis Letts, Laura Ellis, Robert Bradeen, Glen Coburn, Kris Nicolau, and Pat Paulsen as Texas residents who must battle a mist that turns people into zombies.

Premise 
Texas farmers turn into zombies when they become infected by an energy field from outer space.  The residents must escape before an overeager general can convince the President to drop a nuclear bomb on the rural town.

Cast 
 Thom Meyers as Jeff Rhodes
 Dennis Letts as General Sanders
 Laura Ellis as Julie
 Robert Bradeen as Uncle Joe
 Glen Coburn as Ralph Rhodes
 Kris Nicolau as Jeri Jett
 Pat Paulsen as the President

Release 
Bloodsuckers from Outer Space premiered at Joe Bob Briggs' Drive-In Movie Festival in October 1984.  Paulsen attended the premiere and later said that he was embarrassed by the quality.  Karl-Lorimar Home Video released it on home video in 1986, and Media Blasters released it on DVD on December 30, 2008.

Reception 
Travis Box of the Dallas Observer cited it as one of the best low budget films made in Texas.  Mike Phalin of Dread Central rated it 5/5 stars and wrote, "Bloodsuckers From Outer Space could be one of the kings of low budget B-Movies."  Academic Peter Dendle wrote in The Zombie Encyclopedia that it "is a lot like the following year's Return of the Living Dead, except that it isn't funny or exciting."

References

External links 
 

1984 films
1980s comedy horror films
1980s science fiction horror films
American black comedy films
American comedy horror films
American science fiction horror films
American zombie comedy films
Films set in Texas
Films shot in Texas
Alien invasions in films
Vampire comedy films
1984 horror films
American exploitation films
1984 directorial debut films
1984 comedy films
American splatter films
1980s English-language films
1980s American films